The Pacific Rim comprises the lands around the rim of the Pacific Ocean.  The Pacific Basin includes the Pacific Rim and the islands in the Pacific Ocean.  The Pacific Rim roughly overlaps with the geologic Pacific Ring of Fire.

List of countries on the Pacific Rim 
This is a list of countries that are generally considered to be a part of the Pacific Rim, since they lie along the Pacific Ocean.
Arranging from north to south, west to east in directional order.

Oceania 
 Oceania (sovereign states)
 
 
 
 
 
 
 
 
 
 
 
 
 
 
 Oceania (dependent territories)
  British Overseas Territory
 
  External territory of Australia
 
  French overseas collectivities
 
 
 
  Insular Chile
 
  Realm of New Zealand
 
 
 
  United States insular areas
 
 
 
  United States

Americas 
 North America
 
 
 
 
 
 
 
 
 

 South America

Asia
 Russian Federation
 East Asia
 
 
 
 
 
 Southeast Asia

Commerce 
The Pacific has much international shipping. The top 10 busiest container ports, with the exception of Dubai's Port of Jebel Ali (9th), are in the Rim nations. They are home to 29 of the world's 50 busiest container shipping ports:

 
 Busan (5th)
 
 Yokohama (36th)
 Tokyo (25th)
 Nagoya (47th)
 Kobe (49th)
 
 Kaohsiung (12th)
  
 Hong Kong (3rd)

 
 Shanghai (1st)
 Shenzhen (4th)
 Ningbo (6th)
 Guangzhou (7th)
 Qingdao (8th)
 Tianjin (10th)
 Xiamen (19th)
 Dalian (21st)
 Lianyungang (30th)
 Yingkou (34th)

 
 Manila (37th)
 
 Saigon (28th)
 
 Laem Chabang (22nd)
 
 Port Klang (13th)
 Tanjung Pelepas (16th)
 
 Singapore (2nd)

 
 Jakarta (24th)
 Surabaya (38th)
 
 Vancouver (50th)
 
 Los Angeles (17th)
 Long Beach (18th)
 
 Balboa (43rd)

Organizations 

Various intergovernmental and non-governmental organizations focus on the Pacific Rim, including APEC, the East-West Center, Sustainable Pacific Rim Cities, the Pacific Basin Institute, and the Institute of Asian Research. In addition, the RIMPAC naval exercises are coordinated by United States Pacific Command.

Bibliography 

Clausen, A. W. The Pacific Asian Countries: A Force For Growth in the Global Economy. Los Angeles: World Affairs Council, 1984. ED 244 852. 
Cleveland, Harlan. The Future of the Pacific Basin: A Keynote Address. New Zealand: Conference on New Zealand's Prospects in the Pacific Region, 1983. 
Gibney, Frank B., Ed. Whole Pacific Catalog. Los Angeles, CA: 1981. 
"The Pacific Basin Alliances, Trade and Bases." GREAT DECISIONS 1987. New York: Foreign Policy Association, 1987. ED 283 743. 
. A travelogue of a complete journey around the Pacific Rim accompanying the 1997 TV series Full Circle with Michael Palin.
Rogers, Theodore S., and Robert L. Snakenber. "Language Studies in the Schools: A Pacific Prospect." EDUCATIONAL PERSPECTIVES 21 (1982): 12–15. 
Wedemeyer, Dan J., and Anthony J. Pennings, Eds. Telecommunications—Asia, Americas, Pacific: PTC 86. "Evolution of the Digital Pacific." Proceedings of the Annual Meeting of the Pacific Telecommunications Council: Honolulu, Hawaii, 1986. ED 272 147. 
West, Philip, and Thomas Jackson. The Pacific Rim and the Bottom Line. Bloomington, Indiana, 1987.

References

Sources 
 Phillips, Douglas A. and Steven C. Levi.  The Pacific Rim Region:  Emerging Giant.  Hillside, NJ:  Enslow Publishers, 1988.  

Rim